Priya Basil (born 1977 in London, England) is a British author and political activist. Her work has been translated into over half a dozen languages, and her first novel was shortlisted for the Commonwealth Writers' Prize. She is the co-founder of Authors for Peace and an initiator of the movement Writers Against Mass Surveillance.

Writing 
Her first novel, Ishq and Mushq, was published in 2007. Ishq and Mushq is a family saga which illuminates the problem of cultural identity for immigrants over several generations, and raises questions of memory, exile and self-rediscovery. Ishq and Mushq came second in the World Book Day "Book to Talk About 2008" competition. The novel was also short-listed for a Commonwealth Writers' Prize, and long-listed for the Dylan Thomas Prize and the International Dublin Literary Award.

Her second novel, The Obscure Logic of the Heart, was published in June 2010. It tells the love story between the Muslim Lina and the secular Kenyan architecture student, Anil. The characters are caught in the maelstrom of socio-political problems as they try to negotiate between different loyalties – to family, faith, society and themselves.

Priya's novella Strangers on the 16:02 is published on 17 February 2011.

Basil’s work has been translated into Italian, German, Russian, Bulgarian, Brazilian Portuguese, Dutch, Croatian, and Serbian.

In autumn 2014, Priya Basil took up the prestigious Writers' Lectureship at the University of Tübingen. She shared the honour with Chika Unigwe. Taiye Selasi, and Nii Ayikwei Parkes also gave supporting lectures.

Basil's other writings have been published in The Guardian, and the Asia Literary Review, She is a regular contributor to Lettre International, the leading German-language literary magazine. Her themes include art, Europe, democracy, migration and (neo-)colonialism.

Political work

In 2010, Priya co-founded Authors for Peace. with the journalist Matthias Fredrich-Auf der Horst. It is intended to be a platform from which writers can actively use literature in different ways to promote peace. The first event by Authors for Peace took place on 21 September 2010, the UN's International Day of Peace. With the support of the International Literature Festival Berlin, Priya hosted a 24hour-live-online-reading by 80 authors from all over the world. The authors read from their work in a gesture of solidarity with those who are oppressed or caught in conflict.

In September 2013, Basil signed the German novelist Juli Zeh's Open Letter to Angela Merkel. The letter criticizes Merkel's reaction to the Snowden revelations and demands a more robust response. Priya Basil read this letter aloud in public on the opening day of the International Literature Festival Berlin, as part of the festival's 'Berlin Liest' (Berlin Reads) initiative. Later, she helped organize, and took part in the anti-surveillance protest action 'March on the Chancellory', led by Zeh on 18 September 2013.

Basil is also one of the initiators of 'Writers Against Mass Surveillance', a worldwide movement against mass surveillance that was launched on 10 December 2013. Basil is one of the group of seven international writers who wrote the appeal, gathered the first 560 signatures from world-famous writers, and organized the global launch of the appeal. The other initiators are Juli Zeh, Ilija Trojanow, Eva Menasse, Janne Teller, Isabel Cole and Josef Haslinger. The appeal was published through exclusive deals with leading newspapers in more than thirty countries worldwide, for example in Germany the Frankfurter Allgemeine Zeitung, and is also an online pledge at Change.org which the general public can sign.

Basil continues to be active against mass surveillance. She spoke at Re:publica Berlin 2014, and has published essays and articles about the threat mass surveillance poses to democracy and individual freedom, including in the Frankfurter Allgemeine Zeitung, Der Tagesspiegel and the Danish newspaper Politiken.

BücherFrauen, a co-operation of 800 Women from the German Publishing Industry, puts forward an annual list of female candidates for the prestigious Peace Prize of the German Book Trade. In 2013, 2014 and 2015 Priya Basil was one of the 20-odd recommended writers on a list which included Hannah Arendt, Arundhati Roy, Nawal El Saadawi, Herta Müller and Juli Zeh.

In 2017 Priya Basil, together with Ulrich Schreiber, conceptualized and co-curated the International Congress for Freedom and Democracy, which took place from 8–10 September 2017 as part of the International Literature Festival Berlin.

Basil has written extensively on Europe and the future of the European Union, and has argued about the need for an official European public holiday across all member states. In 2017 she launched a campaign, which includes a petition on change.org, for the establishment of such a day. In 2018, at the invitation of Sonja Longolius and Janika Gelinek, directors of the Literaturhaus Berlin, she curates A European Holiday!  – an event intended not just as a cultural extravaganza but as a political intervention – another step towards making the idea of such a day reality.

Personal life

Priya grew up in Kenya, returning to the UK to study English literature at the University of Bristol. She had a brief career in advertising before becoming a full-time writer.

Basil now lives in Berlin. Wired called her "a British, Kenyan, Indian, German-resident fiction-writer. Priya is another of those contemporary novelists whose life wouldn't do within a novel, because it's simply too implausible".

Bibliography

 Ishq and Mushq, 2007 (Hardback , Paperback )
 The Obscure Logic of the Heart, 2010 (Trade Paperback ; Paperback  and )
 Strangers on the 16:02, 2011 (Paperback )
 Erzählte Wirklichkeiten: Tübinger Poetik Dozentur 2014 (Poetics lectures, in German, with Chika Unigwe, Paperback )
 Be My Guest: Reflections on Food, Community and the Meaning of Generosity, non-fiction, 2019 (Hardback )

External links

Videos

 Priya Basil On Reading and Writing
 Priya Basil "Heart – Bite"-Quotes The Obscure Logic of the Heart
 Priya Basil Strangers on the 16:02 – Train Rides 1–12
 Priya Basil "Literary Bridge" – a virtual Join me on the Bridge event initiated by Priya and Authors for Peace for Women for Women International in honour of the 100th anniversary of International Women's Day

Reviews

 Brinda Bose on Ishq and Mushq, India Today (26 March 2007) "Spice Route to Soul"
 James Urquhart on The Obscure Logic of the Heart, Financial Times (8.7.2011): "Basil's novel is subtly played out; passionate and intelligent in scope."
 Eve Lucas on The Obscure Logic of the Heart, ExBerliner (June 2010): "Basil's maturity as a writer is newly reflected in characters whose emotional, ideological and political lives are closely intertwined-redolent of the complex personalities created by writers such as C.P Snow and Evelyn Waugh... Basil spans a large canvas of well observed and entirely credible third world nepotism against which Lina's work for a better world appears as a cry in the desert. Woven into the bigger picture are many small, luminous threads of conversational snippets, situational snapshots, the humdrum of life lovingly seen and recorded. The micro- and the macrocosm are bound together by all that happens in between and above all, in-between people. The book flows at all levels, but here, for me, is Basil's true strength: her interest in people, her sympathy with them, and the way she brings this to bear on her narratives."
 Farhana Shaikh on The Obscure Logic of the Heart, The Asian Writer (July 2010): "A brilliant second book and one that makes a stand to address the complex battle and struggle for identity and independence faced by the modern Asian woman."
 "Romeo, Juliet and Islam" – Tales From The Reading Room-Review of The Obscure Logic of the Heart, August 2010: "I took a bit of a punt on this book as it was outside my usual run of reading, but I absolutely loved it, one of the best reads so far this year. What I admired most was Priya Basil's ability to weave her themes together seamlessly, making the brutality of the world reverberate in distressing ways in the crucible of passionate love between men and women, between parents and children and between good friends. I felt I'd been given an illuminating glimpse into a part of the world about which I knew nothing, and had been caught up in a powerful story that made me think."
 Brinda Bose on The Obscure Logic of the Heart, India Today (7.8.2010): "…what makes Basil's Obscure Logic stand out from any other everyday heart-wrencher is the maturity with which it recognizes that there are no easy choices or irrefutable answers to dilemmas and confusion about the nature of love and passion. Basil seeks neither solutions nor compromises, and yet she writes a prose that burns and scorches with wry conviction about young love that refuses to say die."

Articles

  Shanghai City Weekend Editor "emilyc"'s Live-Blog on Ishq and Mushq
 Priya Basil on Pushing the Limit, Chronicles, Crossing Border Festival, The Hague (November 2007)
 Spotlight Interview, Spotlight Magazine (June 2008)
 Found in Translation, Essay by Priya Basil, Asia Literary Review, Spring 2008
 My Home is Our Castle, Essay by Priya Basil, Heat 22, Giramondo Publishing, Sydney, Spring 2010
 The Asian Writer-Interview on The Obscure Logic of the Heart, July 2010"
 Losing Their Religion, Essay by Priya Basil, Asia Literary Review, Autumn 2010
 Forbidden love, Article by Priya Basil, The Guardian, September 2010
 Interview with Priya Basil  by Kerrie Anne, The View From Here, September 2010
 A brief encounter with the maternal urge, Article by Priya Basil, The Guardian, July 2011
 Merkel must ensure Germany takes a strong moral stand against NSA spying, Article by Priya Basil, The Guardian, September 2013

Notes

References

 http://www.priyabasil.com
 http://literaturfestival.com/autoren-en/autoren-2014-en/priya-basil?searchterm=Priy&set_language=en
 http://www.authorsforpeace.com
 https://web.archive.org/web/20090708002628/http://www.impacdublinaward.ie/2009/Longlist.htm
 http://www.commonwealthfoundation.com/culturediversity/writersprise/2008/shortlists/
 https://web.archive.org/web/20090718111356/http://www.thedylanthomasprize.com/downloads.htm
 https://archive.today/20120908200014/http://www.quickreads.org.uk/about-the-books/new-books-for-2011/strangers-1602
 http://www.guardian.co.uk/books/2007/mar/25/fiction.features7
 https://web.archive.org/web/20110719073835/http://www.depers.nl/cultuur/123498/Mijn-achtergrond-kan-inspirerend-zijn.html (Dutch language quotes from Priya Basil)

British writers
1977 births
Living people